This is a list containing the Billboard Hot Latin Tracks number-ones of 2006.

United States Latin Songs
2006
2006 in Latin music